Suitbert, Suidbert, or Swithbert may refer to:

An Alemannic chieftain who founded the town of Schwieberdingen
Saint Suitbert of Kaiserwerdt
Saint Suitbert the Younger
Suitbert Bäumer, historian

de:Suitbert
fr:Suidbert
nl:Suïtbertus
pl:Święty Suitbert